Calais City Hall is the seat of the city council in Calais, France. It has a 72-metre belfry of red brick and white limestone.

Calls for a new city hall dated from Calais's municipal merger with Saint-Pierre in 1885, and the plan was to put the building in the dunes between the two towns. Louis Debrouwer of Dunkirk was the architect, designing in the Renaissance Revival and Flemish styles. Building began in 1912, was paused during World War I, and concluded in 1925.

In 2003, it was made a monument historique by the French state. In 2005, its belfry was added to the UNESCO World Heritage Site ensemble of the Belfries of Belgium and France.

Les bourgeois de Calais ("The Burghers of Calais") is a sculpture by Auguste Rodin, commissioned by the city and standing in front of the city hall. It depicts the six leading citizens who were taken by Edward III of England after the Siege of Calais (1346–1347) during the Hundred Years' War.

References

City and town halls in France
Buildings and structures in Calais
Monuments historiques of Pas-de-Calais
World Heritage Sites in France
Buildings and structures completed in 1925
Renaissance Revival architecture
20th-century architecture in France